KRGI-FM (96.5 FM) is a radio station broadcasting a New Country format. Licensed to Grand Island, Nebraska, United States, the station serves the Grand Island-Kearney area.  The station is currently owned by Legacy Communications, LLC and features programming from ABC Radio, Premiere Radio Networks and Jones Radio Network.

KRGI-HD3
KRGI broadcasts an active rock format on its HD3 subchannel, branded as "Thunder 97.7 / 99.7" (simulcast on translator K259CZ 99.7 FM Grand Island).  Main Station is KMTY-FM 97.7 which simulcasts on KRGI-HD3.

KRGI-HD2
KRGI airs a regional Mexican format on its HD2 subchannel branded as "La Gran D" (simulcast on translator K227BQ 93.3 FM Grand Island).

KRGI-HD4
On April 4, 2017, KRGI launched a classic country format on its HD4 subchannel, branded as "103.5 The Legend" (simulcast on K278BR 103.5 FM Grand Island).

References

External links

RGI-FM
Country radio stations in the United States